Ustyanka is a rural locality (a selo) and the administrative center of Ustyanovsky Selsoviet of Loktevsky District, Altai Krai, Russia. The population was 841 in 2016. There are 11 streets.

Geography 
Ustyanka is located 27 km north of Gornyak (the district's administrative centre) by road. Georgiyevka is the nearest rural locality.

References 

Rural localities in Loktevsky District